The cere is a part of the beak in some bird species.

Cere may also refer to:

People
 Daniel Cere, professor of religious studies at McGill University
 Jean-Nicolas Céré, French botanist and agronomist in the 18th–19th centuries

Places
 Cère, Landes, a commune in southwestern France 
 Céré-la-Ronde, a commune in central France 
 Cēres Parish, Kandava Municipality, western Latvia

Other
 Cère, a river in southwestern France
 Cēre Manor, a manor house in western Latvia